Éric Amalou (born 1 October 1968 in Le Lamentin, Martinique) is a French handball player who competed at the 1996 Summer Olympics.

References

External links 
 
 
 

1968 births
Living people
French male handball players
Olympic handball players of France
Handball players at the 1996 Summer Olympics
French people of Martiniquais descent
People from Le Lamentin